The Yamaha Passol is an electric scooter manufactured by Yamaha Motor Company beginning in 2002, and sold only in Japan. It was described as the first mass-produced electric motorcycle in Japan (the Peugeot Scoot'Elec was produced earlier). It has a lithium-ion battery. A Passol-L model with the same motor and bigger battery was released in 2005, and a related electric, the EC-02, featuring a built-in iPod dock, also was released in 2005.

A recall for battery problems in the Passol and EC-02 was issued in late 2006, followed by the halting of production of all Yamaha electric motorcycles in 2007 due to the recall coupled with weak sales.

Records and awards
In 2003, the Passol won the Good Design Gold Award (MITI Prize) from Japan's Ministry of International Trade and Industry.

In 2004, Japanese long-distance motorcyclist Kanichi Fujiwara set off to circumnavigate the world on a Passol. It may have been the first global circumnavigation by electric two-wheeler.

In 2004, Yamaha won the Hong Kong Design Centre's Design for Asia Award for Product Design for the Passol.

In exhibitions
A Passol was exhibited in an international show on Japanese design at Metropolitan State College of Denver's Center for Visual Art in 2005.

Specifications

Notes and references

Notes

References

External links
Passol-L electronic brochure from Yamaha Museum's 2003 Tokyo Motor Show display

Passol
Electric scooters
Motorcycles introduced in 2002